Tyler Joseph Nevin (born May 29, 1997) is an American professional baseball infielder for the Detroit Tigers of Major League baseball (MLB). He made his MLB debut in 2021 for the Baltimore Orioles.

Career

Amateur career
Nevin attended Poway High School in Poway, California. He underwent Tommy John surgery as a junior in 2014, forcing him to miss the whole season. As a senior, he had a .409 batting average, seven home runs, and 22 runs batted in (RBIs).

Colorado Rockies
The Colorado Rockies selected Nevin in the first round, with the 38th overall selection, of the 2015 MLB draft. He signed with the Rockies for $2 million, forgoing his commitment to play college baseball at UCLA.
 
Nevin made his professional debut that year with the Grand Junction Rockies and spent the whole season there, batting .265 with two home runs and 18 RBIs in 53 games. He played one game in 2016 for the Boise Hawks before his season was ended due to a hamstring injury. He began 2017 back with Boise, and after six games, was promoted to the Asheville Tourists where he finished the year batting .299/.353/.454 with eight home runs, 52 RBIs, and ten stolen bases. He spent 2018 with the Lancaster JetHawks where he slashed .328/.386/.503 with 13 home runs and 62 RBIs in 100 games. After the season, he played for the Salt River Rafters of the Arizona Fall League where he won the AFL batting title and finished second in MVP voting. He spent 2019 with the Hartford Yard Goats, hitting .251/.345/.399 with 13 home runs and 61 RBIs over 130 games. Nevin was added to the Rockies 40-man roster after the 2019 season.

Baltimore Orioles
On August 30, 2020, the Rockies traded Nevin, Terrin Vavra and a player to be named later to the Baltimore Orioles in exchange for Mychal Givens. Minor-league outfielder Mishael Deson was sent to the Orioles to complete the transaction on September 18. He was assigned to the Triple-A Norfolk Tides to begin the 2021 season. 

On May 28, 2021, Nevin was promoted to the major leagues for the first time, and was announced as the starting first baseman in that day's game against the Chicago White Sox. However, that day's game was postponed due to inclement weather. He made his MLB debut the next day, his 24th birthday. In the game, he notched his first MLB hit, a ground rule double off of White Sox starter Dallas Keuchel.

On October 3, 2021, in the final game of the year, Nevin hit his first major league home run off of Toronto Blue Jays starter Hyun-jin Ryu.

The Orioles optioned Nevin to Norfolk on August 31, 2022. He was designated for assignment on December 21, 2022.

Detroit Tigers

On December 31, 2022, Nevin was traded to the Detroit Tigers in exchange for cash considerations.

Personal life
Nevin is the son of Phil Nevin, a former MLB player and current Los Angeles Angels interim manager.

See also
 List of second-generation Major League Baseball players

References

External links

1997 births
Living people
Asheville Tourists players
Baltimore Orioles players
Baseball players from California
Boise Hawks players
Grand Junction Rockies players
Hartford Yard Goats players
Lancaster JetHawks players
Major League Baseball infielders
Norfolk Tides players
People from Poway, California
Salt River Rafters players